Blake Clark (born February 2, 1946) is an American actor and comedian. He is best known as Chet Hunter on Boy Meets World and Harry "The Hardware Store Guy" on Home Improvement. Clark has voiced Slinky Dog in the Toy Story franchise starting with 2008's Toy Story: The Musical, having inherited the role from his friend Jim Varney, who died of lung cancer in 2000.

Early life

Clark was born and raised in Macon, Georgia, on February 2, 1946. He graduated from LaGrange College in 1969 with a degree in the performing arts.

Career
Clark is a veteran of the Vietnam War, having served as a first lieutenant in the United States Army with the 5th Infantry Division. During his time in the army, Clark was also a member of the 101st Airborne Division known as the "Screaming Eagles."

He has been cast in numerous Adam Sandler films including The Waterboy, Little Nicky, Mr. Deeds, Eight Crazy Nights, 50 First Dates, I Now Pronounce You Chuck & Larry, Bedtime Stories, Grown Ups, and That's My Boy. He has also made guest appearances in numerous television series, including Home Improvement, Boy Meets World, The Jamie Foxx Show, The Drew Carey Show, Girl Meets World, and Community. He was also Fred the chauffeur in Remington Steele. Starting with Toy Story 3, Clark has voiced Slinky Dog in the Toy Story franchise, in place of his close friend Jim Varney, Slinky's original voice actor in the first two films, who died of lung cancer on February 10, 2000. When Toy Story 3 was still in production after Varney had died, Pixar searched for someone who sounded like Varney and fortunately found Clark, who "very much captures the essence and spirit of Slinky Dog's character."

Personal life
Clark has two sons, one of whom, Travis Clark, is also a comedian.

Filmography

Film

Television

Video games

Theme parks

Theatre

References

External links

 

1946 births
Living people
20th-century American comedians
21st-century American comedians
Actors from Macon, Georgia
American male comedians
American male film actors
American male stage actors
American male television actors
American male video game actors
American male voice actors
American stand-up comedians
Comedians from Georgia (U.S. state)
LaGrange College alumni
Male actors from Georgia (U.S. state)
United States Army officers
United States Army personnel of the Vietnam War